William Hore (24 March 1890 – 15 September 1971) was an Australian rules footballer who played with St Kilda, Carlton and Melbourne in the Victorian Football League (VFL).

Notes

External links 

Bill Hore's profile at Blueseum
 

1890 births
1971 deaths
Australian rules footballers from Victoria (Australia)
St Kilda Football Club players
Carlton Football Club players
Melbourne Football Club players
Northcote Football Club players